The Mirror is a 2015 3D horror thriller film directed by Pakphum Wonjinda, Sung-ho Kim and Danny Pang. A China-South Korea co-production, the film was released in China on September 25, 2015.

Cast
Oscar Sun
Jessie Zhou
Eunsung Kim
Lee Chae-young

Reception
The film has earned  at the Chinese box office.

References

External links

2015 horror thriller films
2015 3D films
2015 horror films
Chinese 3D films
Chinese horror thriller films
Films directed by Danny Pang
2010s Korean-language films
South Korean horror thriller films
2010s Mandarin-language films
2010s South Korean films
2015 multilingual films
Chinese multilingual films
South Korean multilingual films